Juan Francisco Lozano Ramírez (born 19 March 1964) is a Colombian lawyer and journalist currently serving as Senator of Colombia and since 2010 has been the General Director of the Social Party of National Unity (Party of the U), Colombia's biggest political and most influential political coalition. Under the Administration of President Álvaro Uribe Vélez he served as the 3rd Minister of Environment, Housing and Territorial Development (2006-2009), High Presidential Advisor (2004-2006), and Presidential Advisor of Social Policy (2004), and had also served as Presidential Advisor for the Youth, Women, and Family (1990-1993) in the Administration of President César Gaviria Trujillo.

References

1964 births
Living people
Politicians from Bogotá
University of Los Andes (Colombia) alumni
20th-century Colombian lawyers
Colombian journalists
Male journalists
Presidential advisers of Colombia
Ministers of Environment, Housing and Territorial Development of Colombia
Social Party of National Unity politicians
Members of the Senate of Colombia